Sutton is a given name of English origin, a transferred use of a surname and place name meaning “from the southern homestead.”

Popularity
The name has recently increased in popularity in the United States, where it has been among the one thousand most popular names for girls since 2013 and among the top three hundred names since 2021. It has also been among the top one thousand names for boys in the United States since 2015.

Notes